Mazda CX may refer to the following Mazda crossover SUVs:

 Mazda CX-3 (subcompact crossover SUV, 2015–present)
 Mazda CX-30 (subcompact crossover SUV, 2019–present)
 Mazda CX-4 (compact crossover SUV sold exclusively in China, 2016–present)
 Mazda CX-5 (compact crossover SUV, 2012–present)
 Mazda CX-50 (compact crossover SUV sold exclusively in North America, 2022–present)
 Mazda CX-60 (mid-size crossover SUV sold exclusively outside North America, 2022–present)
 Mazda CX-7 (mid-size crossover SUV, 2006–2012)
 Mazda CX-70 (mid-size crossover SUV sold exclusively in North America, to commence in 2023)
 Mazda CX-8 (mid-size crossover SUV, 2017–present)
 Mazda CX-80 (mid-size crossover SUV sold exclusively outside North America, to commence in 2023)
 Mazda CX-9 (mid-size crossover SUV sold exclusively outside Japan, 2006–present)
 Mazda CX-90 (large crossover SUV sold exclusively in North America, Australia, and the Middle East, to commence in 2023)

Gallery

References

CX